Barangay elections were held in the country's 42,000 barangays for the positions of barangay captains and six councilors on May 9, 1994.

See also
Commission on Elections
Politics of the Philippines
Philippine elections
President of the Philippines

External links
 The Philippine Presidency Project
 Official website of the Commission on Elections

1994
1994 elections in the Philippines